Dalla merida is a species of butterfly in the family Hesperiidae. It is found in Venezuela.

References

Butterflies described in 1955
merida